The fixture list for the 2023 League One season was issued on 13 November 2022. The regular season comprises 22 rounds to be followed by the play-offs.

All times are UK local time (UTC±00:00 until 26 March 2023, UTC+01:00 thereafter).

Regular season

Round 1

Round 2

Round 3

Round 4

Round 5

Round 6

Round 7

Round 8

Round 9

Round 10

Round 11

Round 12

Round 13

Round 14

Round 15

Round 16

Round 17

Round 18

Round 19

Round 20

Round 21

Round 22

Notes

References

2023 in English rugby league
2023 in Welsh rugby league
RFL League 1